Lee Alan Fuiman is an American marine biologist, currently the Perry Richardson Bass Chair in Fisheries at University of Texas at Austin

Education
Ph.D., University of Michigan (1983) 
M.S., Cornell University (1978) 
B.S., Southampton College of Long Island University (1974)

See also
:Category:Taxa named by Lee A. Fuiman

References

Year of birth missing (living people)
Living people
University of Texas at Austin faculty
Cornell University alumni
American marine biologists
University of Michigan alumni
Southampton College alumni